is a railway station in Miyake, Shiki District, Nara Prefecture, Japan, serving passengers traveling on Kintetsu Railway's Tawaramoto Line. It is 3.0 km (1.9 mi) from Nishi-Tawaramoto, while 7.1 km (4.4 miles) from Shin-Ōji.

Lines 
 Kintetsu Railway
 Tawaramoto Line

Platform and track

Surrounding 
 Nara Prefectural Yamato-Koryo Senior High School

External links
 

Railway stations in Japan opened in 1932
Railway stations in Nara Prefecture